Chase Sanborn (born September 3, 1956) is a well-known Canadian jazz trumpet player and veteran studio musician based in Toronto, Ontario. Originally from New York, Sanborn is an alumnus of the Berklee College of Music and a former member of the Ray Charles Orchestra. Stylistically, Sanborn draws from the traditions of Clifford Brown and Chet Baker.

A celebrated jazz educator, Chase Sanborn's instructional books Jazz Tactics and Brass Tactics have garnered worldwide praise for their insightful yet light-hearted and humorous look at the worlds of jazz improvisation and brass playing. His latest project, the Jazz Tactics DVD takes viewers on a guided tour of the world of jazz improvisation.

Sanborn is a member of the jazz faculty at the University of Toronto, a long-time columnist for Canadian Musician Magazine, and a contributor to a variety of music-related publications.

External links
 Official Website
 University of Toronto Bio
 Canadian Musician Magazine Website

Canadian jazz trumpeters
Male trumpeters
Academic staff of the University of Toronto
Living people
1956 births
Musicians from Toronto
Berklee College of Music alumni
Musicians from New York (state)
21st-century trumpeters
21st-century American male musicians
Canadian male jazz musicians